Alan William Rollinson (15 May 1943 – 2 June 2019) was a British racing driver from England. He entered one Formula One World Championship Grand Prix, the 1965 British Grand Prix, with a Cooper T71/73 run by Gerard Racing, but he failed to qualify. He competed more successfully in various other formulas, including Formula 5000.

He died of cancer in 2019.

Complete Formula One World Championship results
(key)

Complete Formula One Non-Championship results
(key)

References

English racing drivers
English Formula One drivers
Bob Gerard Racing Formula One drivers
European Formula Two Championship drivers
Tasman Series drivers
1943 births
2019 deaths
Sportspeople from Walsall
Deaths from cancer in the United Kingdom